Year 1261 (MCCLXI) was a common year starting on Saturday (link will display the full calendar) of the Julian calendar.

Events 
 By place 
 
 Byzantine Empire 
 March 13 – Treaty of Nymphaeum: Emperor Michael VIII (Palaiologos) signs a trade and defense agreement with the Republic of Genoa, to counterweight the Venetian presence in the region. Genoa agrees to ally with the Empire of Nicaea, by providing a fleet of up to 50 galleys during the projected Nicaean siege of Constantinople, while 16 galleys are to be immediately sent against the Latin Empire.
 July – Michael VIII (Palaiologos) sends his general Alexios Strategopoulos with a small advance force of 800 soldiers, most of them Cumans, to keep watch on the Bulgarians and scout the defending positions of the Latin forces in the surroundings of Constantinople. When they reach the village of Selymbria, Strategopoulos is informed by local farmers that the entire Latin garrison and the Venetian fleet, are absent conducting a raid against the Nicaean island of Daphnousia. He decides not to lose such a golden opportunity and makes plans (without the consent of Michael) to retake the capital.
 July 25 – Reconquest of Constantinople: Alexios Strategopoulos and his men hide at a monastery near the city gates, before entering through a secret passage. After a short struggle, the guards who are completely taken by surprise are killed and the Venetian quarter is set ablaze. Panic spreads through the capital and Emperor Baldwin II rushes out to save his life, evacuating along with many other Latins with the help of the Venetian fleet. Baldwin manages to escape to the still Latin-held parts of Greece, but Constantinople is lost for good.
 August 15 – Michael VIII (Palaiologos) enters Constantinople in triumph and is crowned as emperor of the Byzantine Empire at the Hagia Sophia. To solidify his claim, the legitimate ruler, John IV (Laskaris), is blinded on Michael's orders on his 11th birthday. He banishes him to a monastery and marries his two sisters to lesser Latin and Bulgarian nobles in an attempt to wipe out the Laskarid Dynasty.

 Mongol Empire 
 Kublai Khan releases 75 Chinese merchants, who are captured along the border of the Mongol Empire. By doing this, Kublai hopes to bolster his popularity and depend on the cooperation of his Chinese subjects to ensure that his army receives more resources.

 Levant 
 June 13 – Al-Mustansir becomes the first Abbasid ruler in Cairo (after his escape during the Siege of Baghdad). He is sent with an army by Sultan Baibars I to recover Baghdad, but is killed in a Mongol ambush near Anbar (modern Iraq), on November 28. The Abbasid caliphs continue as religious figureheads for the Mamluks in Egypt until the 16th century.

 England 
 June 12 – King Henry III obtains a papal bull to absolve himself from his oath to maintain the Provisions of Oxford. He hires an army of 300 French knights as a bodyguard and takes up position in the Tower of London. He dismisses the baronial officials (led by Simon de Montfort) who wish the royal power to be modified by the principle of representation. This sets the stage for the Second Barons' War.
 August – Battle of Callann: Norman forces under John FitzThomas are defeated by a Gaelic army led by King Fínghin Mac Carthaigh. John FitzGerald is killed during the fighting.

 Asia 
 February – The Japanese Bun'ō era ends and the Kōchō era begins during the reign of the 11-year-old Emperor Kameyama (until 1264). 

 By topic 

 Literature 
 The earliest extant Chinese illustration of "Pascal's Triangle" is from Yang Hui's (or Qianguang) book Xiangjie Jiuzhang Suanfa, published this year.

 Religion 
 May 25 – Pope Alexander IV dies after a pontificate of 6-years at Viterbo. He is succeeded by Urban IV as the 182nd pope of the Catholic Church.
 August 29 – Urban IV offers the crown of Sicily to Charles of Anjou, youngest son of King Louis VIII (the Lion), hoping to strengthen his position.
 Wurmsbach Abbey (located in Bollingen) is established by Count Rudolf V of Rapperswil in Switzerland.

Births 
 February 1 – Walter de Stapledon, bishop of Exeter (d. 1326)
 February 11 – Otto III, king of Hungary and Croatia (d. 1312)
 February 28 – Margaret of Scotland, queen of Norway (d. 1283)
 March 1 – Hugh le Despenser, English chief adviser (d. 1326)
 July 25 – Arthur II, Breton nobleman  (House of Dreux) (d. 1312)
 October 9 – Denis I (the Poet King), king of Portugal (d. 1325)
 Abu Abdallah ibn al-Hakim, Andalusian vizier and poet (d. 1309)
 'Ala' al-Dawla Simnani, Persian Sufi mystic and writer (d. 1336)
 Albertino Mussato, Italian statesman and chronicler (d. 1329)
 Constantine Palaiologos, Byzantine prince and general (d. 1306)
 Daniel of Moscow (Aleksandrovich), Russian prince (d. 1303)
 Danyi Chenpo Zangpo Pal, Tibetan religious leader (d. 1323)
 Elizabeth of Sicily, queen of Hungary (House of Anjou) (d. 1303)
 Konoe Iemoto, Japanese nobleman (kugyō) and regent (d. 1296)
 Pier Saccone Tarlati, Italian nobleman and condottiero (d. 1356)
 Władysław I Łokietek (Elbow-High), king of Poland (d. 1333)

Deaths 
 February 28 – Henry III (the Good), duke of Brabant (b. 1230)
 April 1 – Ahi Evren, Bektashi Sufi preacher and poet (b. 1169)
 May 25 – Alexander IV, pope of the Catholic Church (b. 1199)
 July 8 – Adolf IV, German nobleman (House of Schaumburg)
 July 25 – Nicephorus II of Constantinople, Byzantine patriarch
 August 24 – Ela of Salisbury, English noblewoman (b. 1187)
 September 18 – Konrad von Hochstaden, German archbishop
 October 27 – Sancho of Castile, Spanish archbishop (b. 1233)
 November 9 – Sanchia of Provence, German queen (b. 1225)
 November 26 – Hōjō Shigetoki, Japanese samurai (b. 1198)
 November 27 – Athanasius III of Alexandria, Egyptian pope
 November 28 – Al-Mustansir, Abbasid ruler (caliph) of Cairo
 Abu Bakr ibn Sayyid al-Nās, Andalusian theologian (b. 1200)
 An-Nasir Dawud, Ayyubid ruler (emir) of Damascus (b. 1206)
 Benedict II, Hungarian chancellor, governor and archbishop
 Bettisia Gozzadini, Italian noblewoman and jurist (b. 1209) 
 Conrad I (the Pious), German nobleman and knight (b. 1186)
 John FitzThomas, Norman nobleman (House of Desmond)
 Plaisance of Antioch, queen consort of Cyprus (b. 1235)
 Qin Jiushao, Chinese mathematician and writer (b. 1202)
 Sayf al-Din al-Bakharzi, Persian poet and sheikh (b. 1190)
 Stephen of Bourbon, French Dominican preacher (b. 1180)

References